Puuhamaa is an amusement park opened in 1984 in the village of Tervakoski, in the municipality of Janakkala, Finland. Like Mikkeli's Visulahti, instead of electrical rides, it mainly offers things to do for children: slides and waterslides, bouncy castles, race tracks, etc. It also has a minigolf course and a video arcade. Its attendance peaks at roughly 5,000 children a day. The park has an entrance fee, but all its features are free.

References

External links
 
 Official pages

Janakkala
Amusement parks in Finland
Buildings and structures in Kanta-Häme
Tourist attractions in Kanta-Häme
Aspro Parks attractions
1984 establishments in Finland
Amusement parks opened in 1984